The Samsung Galaxy A20 is an Android smartphone developed by Samsung Electronics, launched in April 2019. It runs on the Android 9 (Pie) operating system with One UI. The Galaxy A20 model has 32GB internal storage, 3GB RAM, and a 4000 mAh battery. It is a successor to the previous smartphone models by Samsung, Galaxy J6 and Galaxy A6. Discontinued On January 16. 2023.

Specifications

Hardware
The Samsung Galaxy A20 has a 6.4-inch HD+ Super AMOLED Infinity-V Display with a 720 x 1560 resolution. The phone measures 158.4 X 74.7 X 7.8 mm and weighs 169 g. It is powered by an Octa-core (2x1.6 GHz Cortex-A73 & 6x1.35 GHz Cortex-A53) CPU and a Mali-G71 MP2 GPU. It has  32 GB internal storage which can be expanded up to 512 GB via MicroSD. The Galaxy A20 also has 3GB RAM a non-removable 4000 mAh battery with a dual Nano sim card slot.

Software
The Samsung Galaxy A20 runs on Android 9 (Pie) with Samsung's custom skin One UI. The device is upgradable to Android 11.

See also
Samsung Galaxy
Samsung Galaxy A series
Samsung Galaxy J series

References

External links 

 https://www.samsung.com/levant/smartphones/galaxy-a-series/a20/

Samsung smartphones
Samsung Galaxy
Android (operating system) devices
Mobile phones introduced in 2019
Mobile phones with multiple rear cameras